This list of tallest buildings in Kentucky ranks skyscrapers in the U.S. state of Kentucky by height. The tallest building in Kentucky is 400 West Market in Louisville, which rises 167 meters/549 feet and was completed in 1993.



Tallest buildings

This lists ranks Kentucky buildings that stand at least 250 feet (76 m) tall, based on standard height measurement. This includes spires and architectural details but does not include antenna masts. Existing structures are included for ranking purposes based on present height. Out of the 29 buildings, 17 of them are located in Louisville. Out of the remaining 12, 5 buildings are located in Lexington, 3 are in Covington, 2 in Frankfort, 1 in Richmond, and 1 in Bowling Green.

Timeline of tallest buildings

See also

List of tallest buildings in Louisville
Capitol Plaza Towers in Frankfort Demolished
PNC Plaza Bought With Embezzled Money in 2020

References

 Emporis.com Skyscrapers of Louisville
The Encyclopedia of Louisville
 

 
Tallest in Kentucky
Kentucky